John Paul College is a Catholic secondary school in Rotorua, New Zealand. The co-educational school caters for students in years 7 to 13. It was opened in 1987 and combined two existing schools, Edmund Rice College (for boys) and MacKillop College (for girls). The school was founded to serve the Catholic families of Rotorua. John Paul College was named for Pope John Paul II.

Roll
John Paul College has a diverse, multicultural roll. In 2010, its ethnic composition was: NZ European/Pākehā 66%; Māori 14%; Asian 11%; Pacific 4%; Korean 3%; Indian 2%; Filipino 2% and Other 9% The college supports a wide range of cultural and sporting activities and students have gained many successes at regional and national levels. Academically, the school offers for senior years the National Certificate of Educational Achievement assessment system (NCEA). As of 2011, it has a maximum school roll of 1,100 students, not counting international students.

College
John Paul College considers itself to be a Lasallian School whose mission is to form a Community where teachers and students can live their faith and become the persons that God wants them to be. "We believe that the love of Christ binds us together as children of God, peoples of all races and conditions, rich or poor, bright or otherwise, for all are made in God's Image and are members of His family. On this faith rests the mutual love and respect that is fostered between teacher and student in our Schools. We believe as lay colleagues to the De La Salle Brothers we give testimony to the Providence and Presence of God as we educate the young in the tradition of Saint Jean-Baptiste de La Salle, giving attention to all and especially to pupils whose development is hindered by economics, personal and other problems."

The college sees itself as "a top performing state-integrated Catholic school" and as  "the largest co-educational Catholic School in New Zealand". As "a Lasallian school in the Catholic tradition" it is "linked to other faiths through its network of similar schools and universities around the world." It promotes excellence in the academic, sporting and cultural spheres and has comprehensive systems of pastoral care and support to "ensure that each individual student can flourish to his or her fullest potential." Most of the school's classrooms have been rebuilt "over the last seven years." A gymnasium and performing arts centre have been recently built. WiFi is accessible in the classrooms to enable students to use their digital devices for learning. There is also a dedicated music suite with practice rooms and recording studio. The school has a large grass sports field and nine astro-turf courts for tennis, netball and hockey. There are many sporting facilities available in Rotorua for students' use.

On 12 February 2015, the Bishop Denis Browne, Emeritus Bishop of Hamilton, opened the eponymous "Denis Browne Centre" which is a state of the art technology building accommodating Woodwork, Metalwork, Art, Photography and Graphics.

Houses
The John Paul College houses, colours and eponyms are:

Principals
The following individuals have served as principals of the College:

Antecedents

Sisters of St Joseph
In 1902, Mother Mary MacKillop, the founder of the Sisters of St Joseph of the Sacred Heart, went to Rotorua during the last of her four visits to New Zealand. Her doctors had suggested that she might find in the mineral waters some relief from the rheumatic condition that was progressively limiting her activities and causing her considerable distress. In the course of her treatment, on 11 May 1902, she suffered a severe stroke and she seemed near death. As soon as she was recovered sufficiently to be moved, Bishop Lenihan, the fifth Catholic Bishop of Auckland, arranged for her to be transported by rail to Auckland where she convalesced at the Remuera convent for the best part of a year. "It was evidently during her stay in Rotorua that Mother Mary MacKillop saw the great need for a Catholic school there, and set the arrangements in motion."

Father Kreijmborg, Mill Hill missionary priest, in 1902, built a school near the lake in St Michael's Parish and prepared a convent for the sisters who arrived the following year. By 1922 the School was proving inadequate for the number of children seeking admission. The decision was made to build a new school in Ranolf Street; St Joseph's School opened in 1924. The school included a secondary department. "[I]n 1954 the staffing levels at St Joseph's, Rotorua, had reached chronic levels. Class sizes were 57, 75, 78, 80 and 100. The educational impact was severe and struggling staff were advised by the Diocesan Director of Schools on how to 'ensure at least some people progress until staffing can be improved'." This led to the secondary section being closed in 1957, with the only available options for Rotorua Catholic families being at that time Rotorua Boys' High School, Rotorua Girls' High School or a boarding school outside Rotorua. There was a strong demand for Catholic secondary education in Rotorua in the late 1950s. Population growth had been high in the Bay of Plenty area, starting in 1950. This growth was contributed to by Forestry, farming and tourism developments. The population of Rotorua was under 10,000 in 1945 but reached 20,000 by 1963.

Edmund Rice College
In 1959, the seventh Catholic Bishop of Auckland, Archbishop Liston, made a request to the Christian Brothers (already established in the diocese at St Peter's College, Auckland) to establish a secondary school for boys in Rotorua. In 1962 the Christian Brothers decided to go ahead with the Rotorua foundation. The site for the college already existed. In 1946, Catholic land-owner Patrick Keaney had bequeathed 4 acres 27 perches to the Parish of St Mary. In 1958 a further 10 acres 2 roods were purchased. The building of the school commenced in 1962. Edmund Rice College was officially opened in July 1963. On the first day, the college had a roll of 115 boys, of whom 25% were Maori.

"Edmund Rice College school bell rang for the first time in 1963 to the sounds of a construction site. Hammers punctuated English lessons and Maths was conducted as the building multiplies in size around the 115 founding students. It was a rugged start to Rotorua's first Catholic boys' college. The boys were pioneers. The facilities in the early days were very basic. The ovals were just farm fields, the buildings were not complete. Nonetheless, in its opening year the school field[s] sports teams, sent a contingent to Tauranga to meet the Queen and staged a musical. Parents took time off to develop the playing fields and roads. The opening year, 1963, was 201 years after the birth of the school's namesake and founder of the Christian Brothers, Edmund Ignatius Rice. Edmund Rice College was fully staffed by Christian Brothers when it opened but gradually lay teachers were employed as fewer Brothers became available. The college became a State-integrated school in 1983, as a Form 3–7 Secondary College with an attached intermediate School."

MacKillop College
MacKillop College (named after Mary MacKillop (St Mary of the Cross)) for girls was opened by the Sisters of St Joseph of the Sacred Heart on 14 February 1966, on a site adjoining Edmund Rice College, with a foundation roll of 146 girls in Forms I, II and III. The day began with an assembly at which Father D McKenna, parish priest of St Mary's, Rotorua, blessed the five rooms ready for immediate use and he blessed a crucifix for each room. Work had started building the college in 1965. The buildings were finally completed in 1975. MacKillop College was officially opened by Archbishop Liston on 8 May 1966. Difficulties in providing a wide range of subjects at senior level resulted in sharing classes with Edmund Rice College. This was convenient also because the two colleges were situated so closely to each other. In general, the girls went to Edmund Rice College for the science subjects while the boys took languages and biology at MacKillop College. "Integration brought an interesting situation. MacKillop was structured as a 'Form 1–7' school, while Edmund Rice was deemed to be a 'secondary school with an attached intermediate'. This meant teachers working [in] the Form 1 and 2 classes in each school were on different pay scales and the schools were staffed according to two different formulae. And this for schools which were about 200 metres apart!"

Amalgamation
The cost of upgrading the schools when they were integrated and the need to ensure that facilities were not duplicated led Bishop Gaines, the first Catholic Bishop of Hamilton, to decide to amalgamate the schools. The Education Department estimated the cost of upgrading Edmund Rice and MacKillop Colleges to meet integration requirements at $1.2 million. "The decision was surprisingly controversial, and the consultation process could have been done better. There was a feeling among some that the decision to amalgamate had been taken, and that any consultation was simply 'going through the motions'." "Bishop Gaines drove the change and it was his financial genius which pulled off the sale, and later the purchase back of [the] McKillop [College site], for a very healthy profit to the school. The funds from the initial sale enabled John Paul College to build and refurbish, to meet the needs of the growing numbers of students." The amalgamation was completed in May 1987 and Edmund Rice College and MacKillop College closed. Edmund Rice College was in its 25th year. The Christian Brothers Community was reduced to three, was relocated in rented accommodation nearby, and the Brothers former home became the administration centre of John Paul College. In May 1987, John Paul College opened its doors to 687 students. For a time the new school operated in both places, but the former Edmund Rice College was chosen for the new site because it had more potential for development. At the end of 1989 the Christian Brothers Community was withdrawn from Rotorua. The MacKillop buildings have produced rental income for the college.

Legacy
Sister Anne Marie Power R.S.J. has said that Mary MacKillop (St Mary of the Cross) "would have a smile of approval for this important educational venture which is doing so much for the Catholic youth of Rotorua – a place very dear to her heart for the care that was afforded her there in a time of failing health, and especially because it was she herself who initiated the founding of the first Catholic school in Rotorua." The school is also a fitting legacy for Blessed Edmund Rice and the efforts of the Christian Brothers.

Early staff

MacKillop College principals:

Edmund Rice College principals:

Notable alumni

 Cliff Curtis (born 1968), international television and film star; has won three New Zealand Film and TV awards (Edmund Rice College).
 Toby Curtis  (1939 – 2022) -  educator and Māori leader (Sisters of St Joseph of the Sacred Heart, St Michael's).
 Susan Devoy  (born 1964), world champion squash player 1985, 1987, 1990 and 1992 (runner-up in 1989); New Zealand Race Relations Commissioner (2013-2018) (McKillop College).
 Theresa Gattung  - former CEO of Telecom New Zealand (McKillop College)
 Jenna Hastings (born 2004), mountain biker
 Moana Maniapoto  (born 1961) - singer, songwriter and documentary maker (McKillop College).
 Al Pitcher (Allan Geoffrey Pitcher) (born 1972) - stand-up comedian located in Sweden (Edmund Rice College and John Paul College).
 Kane Radford (born 1990), New Zealand's first Olympic open water swimmer
 Clinton Roberts (born 1987), New Zealand radio personality, currently airing on The Edge FM
 Paige Satchell (born 1998), New Zealand footballer, member of New Zealand team at the 2016 Summer Olympics
 Samantha Sinclair (born 1995), New Zealand netball international.

Notable staff
 Coral Palmer – New Zealand netball international who represented her country on seven occasions, including at the 1971 World Netball Championships; netball coach.

See also

 List of schools in New Zealand
 Education in New Zealand
 Catholic Church in New Zealand

Notes
 : "John Baptist De La Salle (1651–1719): In 1998, at the invitation of the Bishop, the association of the College with the De La Salle Brothers began with the establishment of a Brother's community. This association was formalised in 1999 with a request from the Board of trustees that John Paul College become a Lasallian Associated School. This association in no way lessens the contribution of the Christian Brothers or the Sisters of St Joseph of the Sacred Heart, but strengthens and consolidates the spirits given to the College by these two Congregations for all to come to know the mind and heart of Jesus."
 : The diocese of Hamilton, in which Rotorua is located, was not established until 1981.

References

Bibliography

External links
 John Paul College website
 Edmund Rice Network
 Catholic-hierarchy website
 Catholic Diocese of Hamilton (Retrieved 25 February 2015)
 Catholic Church in New Zealand

Congregation of Christian Brothers secondary schools
Congregation of Christian Brothers in New Zealand
Educational institutions established in 1987
Catholic secondary schools in New Zealand
Schools in Rotorua
Secondary schools in the Bay of Plenty Region
1987 establishments in New Zealand